Shortcut Safaari (Hindi:शॉर्टकट सफ़ारी ) is a 2014 Hindi film directed by Amitabha Singh and featuring Bollywood actor Jimmy Sheirgill. The film was initially titled The Trip. Shortcut Safari had its festival premiere at The National Children’s Film Festival (NCFF) on 15 November 2014, established by the Children's Film Society of India (CFSI) at the capital New Delhi.

Amitabha Singh's debut film, Shortcut Safari was screened for the audience of Bengal at Nandan (Kolkata) on 24 December 2014. As part of the 4th Kolkata International Children's Film Festival, a special show of the film was organise by Shishu Kishore Academy, an institution under the aegis of Information and Cultural Affairs Department, Government of West Bengal.

Shortcut Safari is a film in Hindi that revolves around a story of a group of urban children who get trapped in a dense forest during their school outing. 
It's a story of exploration and adventure through the experiences of these seven children over three days, who gain values in mutual respect, team-spirit and perseverance on one hand; and the vital relevance of a clean environment with a balanced wildlife on the other.

Cast
 Jimmy Sheirgill as Chief Jimmy
 Aashi Rawal as Tara
 Sharvil Patel as Rahul
 Mann Patel as Ankur
 Ugam Khetani as Sameer
 Stuti Dwivedi as Hiya
 Deah Tandon as Shinjini
 Hardil Kanabar as Krituporno

Synopsis

Shortcut Safaari' is an entertaining as well as informative, broad spectrum story that revolves around a group of urban, school-going Children (between ages 10 to 14 years) who get stranded - far away from their homes and families! Imagine what will happen when such a bunch of city kids get stuck in the deep of a dense forest! Seven of them... all different and quirky. That too, for three days- completely on their own!! Well... they have their share of fun- Naturally! In 'Shortcut Safaari'. To top it, they have a chance encounter with two poachers; called 'Kaju' and 'Katli' who are roaming the forest in hunt of a rare, clouded leopard 'Jimmy'. The kids manage to subdue the poachers and hold them captive, but that leads to a much bigger confusion... and a fun-filled roller-coaster like experience for the young and the restless! But... Actually... Who is the real Jimmy!? Come to meet him in this entertaining story of exploration and adventure through the eyes of these children. Who, in turn, gain values on mutual respect, team-spirit and perseverance on one hand; and the vital relevance of a sustainable environment with a balanced wild-life on the other. And the kids are- baby 'Tara'; big bully 'Ankur'; smarty 'Krituporno'; fashionable 'Hiya'; brave 'Rahul'; careful 'Samir' and wise 'Shinjini'. So, come and share their experience on 'Shortcut Safaari'!!

Festivals
Shortcut Safari is a film based on adventure and mystery.
The festival screening was an event with Jimmy Shergill, Singh and the cast of the film present on the occasion.
Actor Jimmy Shergill stated it was exciting to be part of the project that has a cause.
Sheirgill plays a key role in Shortcut Safari that has been directed by Amitabha Singh.

Music

The music album of Shortcut Safaari has 5 different kinds of tracks and offers variety for everyone. Shaan has sung 'Piggy Bank' composed by Samir-Mana. This is a very peppy number in the film which has been picturized on the kids. Sadhana Sargam and Atreyi Bhattacharya have lent their voices to ‘Ek Dhara Ke Jan Gan’ which has been composed by Rohit Sharma. ‘Bako Sufu’, ‘Zor Lagaa De’, ‘Dip Dip Dara’ are some of the other tracks which provide spunk to the album. This adventure film traces the lives of a few school going kids who get lost in a dense forest during their outing. Junglee music (Powered by the Times Group) is the official music label of the movie.

References

External links

2014 films
2010s Hindi-language films